Antonio Plazibat (born 12 December 1993) is a Croatian professional kickboxer, who currently competes in the Heavyweight division of Glory. Plazibat was the 2014 FFC Futures Light Heavyweight tournament winner, the 2017 K-1 WGP Heavyweight World Grand Prix winner and a former K-1 Heavyweight Champion. 

At the amateur level, Plazibat was a three-time national champion, having won the Croatian Kickboxing Championships consecutively between 2015 and 2017. Plazibat captured medals at both the WAKO world and continental tournaments, as he won the silver medal at the 2015 WAKO World Championships and the gold medal at the 2018 European Championships.

As of January 2023, he is ranked as the second best heavyweight kickboxer in the world by both Beyond Kick and Combat Press. Combat Press has ranked him as a top ten heavyweight continually since August 2021.

Amateur career  
Antonio Plazibat began his kickboxing career as an amateur, training with Ameno Gym. His first fight was against Dražen Kuraja in the semifinal bout of the 2013 Croatian Kickboxing Championship 91 kg tournament. Despite being the underdog, Plazibat knocked Kuraja down twice, and would go on to win a unanimous decision. In the finals he faced Andrija Lekić. Despite fighting with a broken hand, he managed to knock him down once, and won a unanimous decision.

He would again fight in the Croatian Kickboxing Championship, when he entered their 2014 91 kg tournament. Despite beginning with two wins, he lost to Andrija Lekić in the semifinals. In the 2015 edition of the 91 kg Croatian Kickboxing Championship tournament, he would make it to the finals, to once again face Andrija Lekić. He would seal the trilogy with a win, becoming the 2015 91 kg tournament champion.

Plazibat fought in the 2015 W.A.K.O World Championship. He won his first three fights, but lost to Basir Abakarov in the finals, securing a second place finish. He won the Croatian Kickboxing Championship tournament for the second time in 2016, beating Anto Širić by unanimous decision.

His last feature in an amateur tournament was in 2018 edition of the W.A.K.O European Championships. He would go a perfect 3-0, to win his last amateur title.

Professional career

Early career
Plazibat made his professional debut in August 2013, during Oluja u Ringu 5, against Marko Vidović. He won the fight by a third round head kick. Plazibat notched two more victories on the regional circuit, winning decisions against Simon Krizmanić and Franci Grajš.

Plazibat then signed a contract with Final Fight Championship. He was immediately placed in the FFC Futures Kickboxing Light Heavyweight tournament. In the semifinals, Plazibat defeated Stipe Stipetić by a second round TKO, and in the finals, he defeated Mitar Dugalić by a third round TKO.

Plazibat notched two more wins with the organization, defeating Bojan Džepina and Daniel Škvor by knockout. His winning streak earned Plazibat his highest profile fight of his career up to that point, as he was scheduled to fight Sergej Maslobojev at FFC 22: Athens. Maslobojev won the fight by a second round TKO, after the ringside doctor waved the fight off due to a cut.

SUPERKOMBAT
Plazibat was scheduled to face the former SUPERKOMBAT cruiserweight champion Bogdan Stoica at Respect World Series 2 on July 2, 2016. Plazibat won the fight by a second-round technical knockout. Stoica fell down several times in the second round, as he seemed unable to put weight on his leg, prompting the referee to stop the fight due to injury.

Plazibat made his SUPEROMBAT debut against Dănuț Hurduc at SUPERKOMBAT World Grand Prix IV 2016 on August 6, 2016. Plazibat won the fight by unanimous decision, scoring a knockdown in the second round.

Plazibat was scheduled to face Frank Muñoz at W5 European League XXXVI on September 10, 2016. He won the fight by unanimous decision.

Asian circuit

K-1 Heavyweight champion 
Plazibat participated in the 2017 K-1 Heavyweight World Grand Prix, which was held at K-1 World GP 2017 Japan Heavyweight Championship Tournament on November 23, 2017. To better prepare for the tournament, Plazibat added the 1993 K-1 World Grand Prix winner Branko Cikatić to his training staff. He was scheduled to face K-Jee in the tournament quarterfinals. Plazibat scored an early knockdown on K-Jee, as he dropped him with a left hook. Although he was able to beat the eight count, K-Jee was soon after dropped once again with a hook to the body, from which he was unable to recover in time. Plazibat advanced to the semifinals, where he faced the former RISE Heavyweight and Light Heavyweight champion Makoto Uehara. He made quick work of Uehara, flooring him with a flying knee at the 2:09 minute mark of the first round. Plazibat faced Ibrahim El Bouni in the tournament finals. He beat him by unanimous decision.
 
Plazibat was scheduled to make his first K-1 title defense against Roel Mannaart at K-1 World GP 2018: K'FESTA.1 on March 21, 2018. He lost the fight by unanimous decision.

ONE Championship 
After losing in his first K-1 title defense, Plazibat signed with the Singaporean-based promotion ONE Championship. He was scheduled to make his promotional debut against Sergej Maslobojev at ONE Championship: Grit and Glory on May 12, 2018. The fight was a rematch of their February 19, 2016, meeting, when Maslobojev handed Plazibat his first professional loss. Maslobojev won the fight by unanimous decision.

Plazibat was scheduled to face Michal Turynski for the WAKO Pro World Super Cruiserweight Low Kick title at Memorijal Ludviga Lutka Pavlovica on November 24, 2018. Plazibat won the fight by a third-round knockout.

GLORY

2019
Plazibat subsequently left Ameno Gym and joined Mike's Gym. In early 2019, Plazibat signed with the Netherlands-based promotion Glory. He was scheduled to face the 36-fight veteran and former WAKO European champion Nordine Mahieddine is his debut at Glory 66: Paris on June 22, 2019. Mahieddine was originally set to face Tomas Mozny, before Mozny withdrew from the bout with an injury. Plazibat won the fight by unanimous decision. He had a slow start to the fight, as all five judges scored the fight for Mahieddine, but rebounded to win the second and third rounds. He was awarded a 29-28 scorecard by all five of the judges.
 
For his second fight with the promotion, Plazibat was scheduled to face Tomáš Možný at Glory 69: Düsseldorf on October 12, 2019. He won the fight by unanimous decision. Plazibat once again had a slow start, dropping the first round on all five of the judges scorecards. He upped the pace as the fight resumed, and forced a standing count from Mozny 60 seconds into the second round. This was quickly followed up with a second knockdown, which earned Plazibat a 10-7 scorecard for the round. Plazibat was able to knock Mozny one additional time with a right straight at the 1:15 minute mark of the second round. Although he was unable to finish his opponent, Plazibat was awarded a 29-25 score by all five judges.
 
Plazibat was next scheduled to face the #4 ranked Glory heavyweight, and former Enfusion light heavyweight champion, Jahfarr Wilnis. The fight between the two was announced for Glory Collision 2 on December 21, 2019. Plazibat won the fight by split decision, in front of a 20 000 people audience in a sold out GelreDome. Four of the judges scored the fight 29-28 for Plazibat, while the fifth judge awarded Wilnis a 29-28 scorecard. Plazibat threw a grand total of 250 strikes during the nine minute bout. Following this victory, Plazibat achieved the #5 ranking in the official Glory heavyweight rankings.

2020
Plazibat was scheduled to face the former Enfusion Heavyweight champion Levi Rigters in the quarterfinals of a four-man heavyweight tournament, which was set to be held at Glory 76: Rotterdam on November 7, 2020. On October 7, 2020, the semifinal pairings were altered. Plazibat was rescheduled to face Nordine Mahieddine, while Rigters was rescheduled to face Jahfarr Wilnis. The entire event was later postponed when Badr Hari, who was scheduled to fight in the main event, contracted COVID-19. The event was rescheduled for December 19, 2020. Plazibat lost the quarterfinal bout by split decision, after an extra round was fought. He was knocked down in the first round, but managed to win the second and third rounds, which prompted an extra round. Mahieddine appeared to have done more in the additional round, and was awarded the split decision.

2021
After his first loss in Glory, Plazibat was scheduled to fight the promotional newcomer Tarik Khbabez at Glory 77 on January 30, 2021. Plazibat later stated that he was offered the Khbabez fight by Glory, but refused the fight due to right hand injuries. He was rescheduled to fight Tarik Khbabez at Glory 78: Arnhem on September 4, 2021. He won the fight by a second-round knockout. The knockout itself was preceded by a left hook knockdown, early on in the second round.

Plazibat was scheduled to face promotional newcomer James McSweeney at Glory: Collision 3 on October 23, 2021. It was McSweeny's first kickboxing bout in over two years, with his last being a technical knockout loss to Ismael Londt on December 7, 2019. On October 8, Glory rescheduled a number of heavyweight bouts due to Overeem's withdrawal from the event. Accordingly, Plazibat was rescheduled to face the #2 ranked Glory heavyweight Benjamin Adegbuyi. Plazibat won the fight by knockout, 24 seconds into the second round. He knocked Adegbuyi down with two consecutive right straights, which first forced his opponent to grab onto the ropes, before dropping to the canvas. Although Adegbuyi was able to stand up in time for the eight count, he was unsteady on his feet which prompted the referee to stop the bout.

2022
Plazibat is scheduled to face Tarik Khbabez at Glory 80 Studio on May 14, 2022. The fight will be a rematch of their September 4, 2021 bout, which Plazibat won by a second-round knockout. Plazibat won the fight by a third-round knockout, stopping his opponent with a flurry of punches at the 0:52 minute mark. He appeared to have injured his knee in the second round, as he fell several times, and revealed in a later interview that he had suffered a partial ligament tear.

On July 7, 2022, it was revealed that Plazibat would face the winner of the Benjamin Adegbuyi versus Jamal Ben Saddik heavyweight bout, which was held at Glory 81, for the interim Glory Heavyweight Championship. On September 1, Glory revealed that the bout would not take place, as Plazibat and Ben Saddik refused to face each other.

Plazibat is scheduled to face the #10 ranked Glory heavyweight and former two-time K-1 World Grand Prix finalist Raul Cătinaș in the main event of Glory 82 on November 19, 2022. Plazibat needed just 100 seconds to stop his opponent, staggering Cătinaș with a right hook and finishing him with a flurry of punches.

2023
During a Glory press-conference held on January 12, 2023, it was confirmed by Glory that Plazibat was expected to challenge Rico Verhoeven for the Glory Heavyweight Championship. Although the fight was initially planned to take place in spring, it was postponed as Verhoeven suffered a knee injury in training.

Personal life
Plazibat is engaged to be married to his long-time girlfriend Martina Dulčić. Plazibat has a son, who was born in 2017. He is a self-professed Catholic. Plazibat also runs his own YouTube channel.

Championships and accomplishments

Professional
World Association of Kickboxing Organizations
2018 WAKO Pro World Low Kick Super Heavyweight Champion +94.2 kg.
K-1
2017 K-1 Heavyweight Champion -100 kg.
2017 K-1 World GP 2017 Heavyweight Championship Tournament -100 kg.
Final Fight Championship
2014 FFC Futures Kickboxing Light Heavyweight Tournament -91 kg.

Amateur
World Association of Kickboxing Organizations
2018 W.A.K.O. European Championships  +91 kg. (K-1 Rules)
2015 W.A.K.O. World Championships  -91 kg. (Low-Kick Rules)
Croatian Kickboxing Federation
2017 Croatian Kickboxing Championships  +91 kg. (K-1 rules)
2017 Croatian Kickboxing Championships  +91 kg. (Low Kick rules)
2016 Croatian Kickboxing Championships  -91 kg. (K-1 rules)
2015 Croatian Kickboxing Championships  -91 kg. (Low-kick rules)
2014 Croatian Kickboxing Championships  -91 kg. (Low-kick rules)
2013 Croatia Open Zagreb 2013  -91 kg. (Low-kick rules)

Awards
Liverkick.com
2017 Knockout of the Year 
Glory
2019 Newcomer of the Year
2019 Fight of the Year 
2021 Most Improved Fighter of the Year
2022 Knockout of the Year 
2022 Fighter of the Year

Kickboxing record

|-  style="background:#;"
|- bgcolor="#cfc"
| 2022-11-19 || Win ||align="left"| Raul Cătinaș || Glory 82 || Bonn, Germany || KO (Punches) || 1 || 1:40 || 22–4
|- bgcolor="#cfc"
| 2022-05-14 || Win || align="left" | Tarik Khbabez || Glory 80 Studio || Netherlands || KO (Punches) || 3 || 0:52 ||21–4
|-
|-  bgcolor="#cfc"
| 2021-10-23 || Win || align="left" | Benjamin Adegbuyi || Glory: Collision 3 || Arnhem, Netherlands || KO (Punches) || 2 || 0:24 || 20–4 
|-  bgcolor="#cfc"
| 2021-09-04 || Win || align="left" | Tarik Khbabez || Glory 78: Arnhem || Arnhem, Netherlands || KO (Punches) || 2 || 2:14 ||19–4
|-  bgcolor="#fbb"
| 2020-12-19 || Loss || align="left" | Nordine Mahieddine || Glory 76: Rotterdam, Tournament Semi Final|| Rotterdam, Netherlands || Ext.Round Decision (Split) || 4 || 3:00 || 18–4
|-  bgcolor="#CCFFCC"
| 2019-12-21|| Win||align=left| Jahfarr Wilnis || Glory Collision 2 || Arnhem, Netherlands || Decision (Split) || 3 || 3:00|| 18–3
|-  bgcolor="#CCFFCC"
| 2019-10-12 || Win ||align=left| Tomáš Možný  || Glory 69: Düsseldorf || Düsseldorf, Germany  || Decision (Unanimous) || 3 || 3:00 || 17–3
|-  bgcolor= "#CCFFCC"
| 2019-06-22 || Win ||align=left| Nordine Mahieddine || Glory 66: Paris || Paris, France || Decision (Unanimous)  || 3 || 3:00|| 16–3
|-
|-  bgcolor= "#CCFFCC"
| 2018-11-24 || Win ||align=left| Michal Turynski   || Memorijal Ludviga Lutka Pavlovica || Ljubuški, Bosnia and Herzegovina || KO (Right straight) || 3 || N/A || 15–3
|-
! style=background:white colspan=9 |
|- 
|-  bgcolor= "#FFBBBB"
| 2018-05-12 || Loss ||align=left| Sergej Maslobojev  || ONE Championship: Grit and Glory || Jakarta, Indonesia || Decision (Unanimous) || 3 || 3:00 || 14–3
|-
|-  bgcolor= "#FFBBBB"
| 2018-03-21 || Loss ||align=left| Roel Mannaart  || K-1 World GP 2018: K'FESTA.1 || Saitama, Japan || Decision (Unanimous) || 3 || 3:00 || 14–2
|-
! style=background:white colspan=9 |
|- 
|-  bgcolor="#CCFFCC"
| 2017-11-23 || Win ||align=left| Ibrahim El Bouni  || K-1 World GP 2017 Japan Heavyweight Championship Tournament, Final || Saitama, Japan || Decision (Unanimous)  || 3 || 3:00 || 14–1
|-
! style=background:white colspan=9 |
|- 
|- bgcolor="#CCFFCC"
| 2017-11-23 || Win ||align=left| Makoto Uehara  || K-1 World GP 2017 Japan Heavyweight Championship Tournament, Semi Finals || Saitama, Japan || KO (Flying Knee) || 1 || 2:09 || 13–1
|-
|-  bgcolor="#CCFFCC"
| 2017-11-23 || Win ||align=left| K-Jee  || K-1 World GP 2017 Japan Heavyweight Championship Tournament, Quarter Finals || Saitama, Japan || KO (Left Hook to the Body)  || 1 || 1:40 || 12–1 
|-
|-  bgcolor="#CCFFCC"
| 2017-08-26 || Win ||align=left| Liang Jie || SUPERKOMBAT World Grand Prix III 2017  || Shenzhen, China || Decision (Unanimous)  ||  3 || 3:00 || 11–1
|-
|-  bgcolor="#CCFFCC"
| 2016-09-10 || Win ||align=left| Frank Muñoz || W5 European League XXXVI  || Zvolen, Slovakia || Decision (Unanimous)  ||  3 || 3:00 || 10–1
|-
|-  bgcolor="#CCFFCC"
| 2016-08-06 || Win ||align=left| Dănuț Hurduc || SUPERKOMBAT World Grand Prix IV 2016 || Comănești, Romania || Decision (Unanimous) || 3 || 3:00 || 9–1
|- 
|-  bgcolor= "#CCFFCC"
| 2016-07-02 || Win ||align=left| Bogdan Stoica || Respect World Series 2 || London, England || TKO (Leg Injury) || 2 || N/A || 8–1
|-
|-  bgcolor="#FFBBBB"
| 2016-02-19 || Loss ||align=left| Sergej Maslobojev || FFC22: Athens || Athens, Greece || TKO (Cut) || 2 || 3:00 || 7–1
|-
|-  bgcolor= "#CCFFCC"
| 2015-09-18 || Win||align=left| Daniel Škvor || FFC 19 - Linz || Linz, Austria || TKO (Three Knockdowns) || 2 || 2:42 || 7–0
|-
|-  bgcolor="CCFFCC"
| 2015-03-13 || Win ||align=left| Bojan Džepina || FFC 7: Poturak vs. Munoz || Sarajevo, Bosnia and Herzegovina || TKO (Referee stoppage) || 3 || 2:14 || 6–0
|-
|-  bgcolor="CCFFCC"
| 2014-12-20 || Win ||align=left| Mitar Dugalić || FFC 17 Futures Super Finals, Final || Opatija, Croatia || KO (Right straight) || 3 || 0:44 || 5–0
|-
! style=background:white colspan=9 |
|-
|-  bgcolor="CCFFCC"
| 2014-12-20 || Win ||align=left| Stipe Stipetić || FFC 17 Futures Super Finals, Semi Finals || Opatija, Croatia || TKO || 2 || 1:42 || 4–0
|-
|-  bgcolor="#CCFFCC"
| 2014-11-29 || Win ||align=left| Franci Grajš || International Muay Thai League (-91 kg) || Novo Mesto, Slovenia || Decision (Unanimous) || 3 || 3:00 || 3–0
|-
|-  bgcolor="#CCFFCC"
| 2014-08-22 || Win ||align=left| Simon Krizmanić || Trojan Fight Night 2  || Pula, Croatia || Decision (Majority) || 3 || 2:00 || 2–0
|-
|-  bgcolor="#CCFFCC"
| 2013-08-04 || Win ||align=left| Marko Vidović || Oluja u Ringu 5  || Knin, Croatia || KO (High Kick) || 3 || N/A || 1–0
|-
! style=background:white colspan=9 |
|-

|-
|-  bgcolor="#CCFFCC"
| 2018-10-20 || Win ||align=left| Bahram Rajabzadeh || W.A.K.O European Championships 2018, K-1 Final +91 kg  || Bratislava, Slovakia || 2:1 || 3 || 2:00
|-
! style=background:white colspan=9 | 
|-
|-  bgcolor="#CCFFCC"
| 2018-10-19 || Win ||align=left| Petr Romankevich || W.A.K.O European Championships 2018, K-1 Semi Finals +91 kg  || Bratislava, Slovakia || 2:1 || 3 || 2:00
|-
|-  bgcolor="#CCFFCC"
| 2018-10-18 || Win ||align=left| Hamdi Saygili ||W.A.K.O European Championships 2018, K-1 Quarter Finals +91 kg  || Bratislava, Slovakia || TKO || 2 || N/A
|-
|-  bgcolor="#CCFFCC"
| 2017-06-03 || Win ||align=left| Tomislav Čikotić || Croatian Kickboxing Championship 2017, K-1 Finals +91 kg || Benkovac, Croatia || 3:0 || 3 || 2:00
|-
! style=background:white colspan=9 |
|-
|-  bgcolor="#CCFFCC"
| 2017-06-03 || Win ||align=left| Ante Verunica || Croatian Kickboxing Championship 2017, K-1 Semifinals +91 kg || Benkovac, Croatia || 3:0 || 3 || 2:00
|-
|-  bgcolor="#FFBBBB"
| 2017-04-30|| Loss ||align=left| Tomislav Čikotić || Croatian Kickboxing Championship 2017, Low Kick Finals +91 kg || Opatija, Croatia || 3:0 || 3 || 2:00
|-
! style=background:white colspan=9 |
|-
|-  bgcolor="#CCFFCC"
| 2017-04-30|| Win ||align=left| Ante Verunica || Croatian Kickboxing Championship 2017, Low Kick Semifinals +91 kg || Opatija, Croatia || WO || N/A || N/A
|-
|-  bgcolor="#CCFFCC"
| 2017-04-30|| Win ||align=left| Davor Krstulović || Croatian Kickboxing Championship 2017, Low Kick Quarterfinals +91 kg || Opatija, Croatia || 3:0 || 3 || 2:00 
|-
|-  bgcolor="#CCFFCC"
| 2016-05-28 || Win ||align=left| Anto Širić || Croatian Kickboxing Championship 2016, K-1 Semi Finals -91 kg || Benkovac, Croatia || 3:0 || 3 || 2:00
|-
! style=background:white colspan=9 |
|-
|-  bgcolor="#CCFFCC"
| 2016-05-28 || Win ||align=left| Leo Pavičić || Croatian Kickboxing Championship 2016, K-1 Semi Finals -91 kg || Benkovac, Croatia || 3:0 || 3 || 2:00
|-
|-  bgcolor="#FFBBBB"
| 2015-10-31 || Loss ||align=left| Basir Abakarov || W.A.K.O World Championships 2015, Low-Kick Final -91 kg  || Belgrade, Serbia || 3:0 || 3 || 2:00
|-
! style=background:white colspan=9 | 
|-
|-  bgcolor="#CCFFCC"
| 2015-10-30 || Win ||align=left| Bojan Džepina || W.A.K.O World Championships 2015, Low-Kick Semi Finals -91 kg  || Belgrade, Serbia || 3:0 || 3 || 2:00
|-
|-  bgcolor="#CCFFCC"
| 2015-10-29 || Win ||align=left| Zamig Athakishiyev || W.A.K.O World Championships 2015, Low-Kick 1/8 Finals -91 kg  || Belgrade, Serbia || 3:0 || 3 || 2:00
|-
|-  bgcolor="#CCFFCC"
| 2015-10-27 || Win ||align=left| Vladislav Gribincea || W.A.K.O World Championships 2015, Low-Kick 1/16 Finals -91 kg  || Belgrade, Serbia || KO || N/A || N/A
|-
|-  bgcolor="#CCFFCC"
| 2015-04-11 || Win ||align=left| Andrija Lekić || Croatian Kickboxing Championship 2015, Low-kick Final -91 kg || Poreč, Croatia || 3:0 || 3 || 2:00
|-
! style=background:white colspan=9 |
|-
|-  bgcolor="#CCFFCC"
| 2015-04-11 || Win ||align=left| Toni Čatipović || Croatian Kickboxing Championship 2015, Low-kick Semi Finals -91 kg || Poreč, Croatia || 2:1 || 3 || 2:00
|-
|-  bgcolor="#CCFFCC"
| 2015-04-11 || Win ||align=left| Nenad Kovačević || Croatian Kickboxing Championship 2015, Low-kick Quarter Finals -91 kg || Poreč, Croatia || 3:0 || 3 || 2:00
|-
|-  bgcolor="#FFBBBB"
| 2014-04-12 || Loss ||align=left| Andrija Lekić || Croatian Kickboxing Championship 2014, Low-kick Semi Finals -91 kg || Poreč, Croatia || 3:0 || 3 || 2:00
|-
! style=background:white colspan=9 |
|-
|-  bgcolor="#CCFFCC"
| 2014-04-12 || Win ||align=left| Josip Perica || Croatian Kickboxing Championship 2014, Low-kick Quarter Finals -91 kg || Poreč, Croatia || 3:0 || 3 || 2:00
|-
|-  bgcolor="#CCFFCC"
| 2013-12-15 || Win ||align=left| Andrija Lekić || Croatia Open Zagreb 2013, Low-kick Final -91 kg || Zagreb, Croatia || 3:0 || 3 || 2:00
|-
! style=background:white colspan=9 |
|-
|-  bgcolor="#CCFFCC"
| 2013-12-15 || Win ||align=left| Dražen Kuraja || Croatia Open Zagreb 2013, Low-kick Semi Finals -91 kg || Zagreb, Croatia || 3:0 || 3 || 2:00
|-
| colspan=9 | Legend:

See also 
 List of K-1 champions 
 List of male kickboxers

External links
 Profile at Glory

References

Living people
Croatian male kickboxers 
Cruiserweight kickboxers
Heavyweight kickboxers
Sportspeople from Split, Croatia
1993 births
Glory kickboxers
SUPERKOMBAT kickboxers
ONE Championship kickboxers
Kickboxing champions